The 4th West Virginia Cavalry Regiment was a cavalry regiment that served in the Union Army during the American Civil War.

Service
The 4th West Virginia Cavalry Regiment was enlisted in Parkersburg and Wheeling in western Virginia between July and August 1863 for one year's service.

 January 30, 1864, Engagement at Moorefield

The regiment was mustered out on June 23, 1864.

Casualties
The 4th West Virginia Cavalry Regiment suffered 30 enlisted men dead from disease for a total of 30 deaths.

Officers

Colonel 
 Joseph Snider (formerly of the 7th West Virginia Infantry)

Lieutenant-Colonel 
 Samuel W. Snider

Majors 
 Nathan Goff Jr. (formerly of the 6th West Virginia Cavalry). He was captured during the action at Moorefield, when pinned under his fallen horse, and sent to Libby Prison in Richmond, Virginia where he was held in close confinement as a hostage for the captured Confederate Major Thomas D. Armsey. He and Armsey were eventually exchanged and President Abraham Lincoln sent for Goff, who described the conditions in Confederate prison camps, prompting Lincoln to arrange further exchanges.
 Charles F. Howes
 James A. Smith

QM Sergeants 

 Octavius C. Bray  Company A 1863-65

First Sergeant 

 Montgomery Hager Company K

See also
West Virginia Units in the Civil War
West Virginia in the Civil War

References
The Civil War Archive
West Virginia in the Civil War Website
Octavius Bray QM Sergeant 4th WV Cavalry

Units and formations of the Union Army from West Virginia
1863 establishments in West Virginia
Military units and formations established in 1863
Military units and formations disestablished in 1864